Kikkis bästa was released on February 27, 2008, and is a double compilation album by Kikki Danielsson. It peaked at #15 at the Swedish album chart.

2008 was 35 years since Kikki Danielsson became lead vocalist in Wizex, and 30 years since her break-through at the Swedish Melodifestivalen 1978.

The album consists of well-known hits, but also rarer recordings, such as Right Night for Loving (Bra vibrationer with lyrics in English, which earlier had only been released outside Sweden and not been available on CD. The compilation also contains "That'll Be the Day", a recording Kikki Danielsson made with Wizex, which had only been on the flipside of a Christmas promo sent out by Mariann Grammofon AB in 1979.

Track listing

CD 1
Bra vibrationer
En timme för sent
9 to 5
Miss Decibel (Wizex)
Lätta dina vingar
Minnet (Memory)
I dag & i morgon
Diggy Diggy Lo
Papaya Coconut
God morgon (Chips)
Ett hus med många rum (Roosarna)
Rock'n Yodel
När vi rör varann (Sometimes When We Touch)
Vem går med dig hem (Amico e), duet with Kjell Roos
Öppna vatten
En allra sista chans (Achy Breaky Heart)
I Love a Rainy Night
You Don't Have to Say You Love Me (Io che non vivo senza te)
Mitt innersta rum
I mitt hjärta brinner lågan (with Ole Ivars)
En enda gång
Sången skall klinga
Väntar ännu på den morgon (Waiting for the Morning)

CD 2
Dag efter dag
Mycke' mycke' mer
Hem till Norden with (Roosarna)
Vem é dé du vill ha
Ge mig sol, ge mig hav
Jag trodde änglarna fanns (with Ole Ivars)
Dagar som kommer och går
Cowboy Yodel Song 
Talking in Your Sleep
Här är jag igen (Here You Come Again)
Rädda pojkar
Och vi hörde klockor ringa (Les trois cloches)
Varför är kärleken röd?
Amazing Grace
That'll Be the Day
Se dig i din spegel
Stand by Your Man
Flyg fri
Singles Bar
Good Year for the Roses
Som en sol
Vi låser dörren in till damernas (Let's Talk it over in the Ladies Room)
El Lute
Right Night for Loving (Bra vibrationer)

Charts

References

2008 compilation albums
Kikki Danielsson compilation albums